The Lost Gonzo Band was an American country rock band which was founded in 1972 and toured and recorded with some of the most iconic and colorful musicians in Texas including Jerry Jeff Walker, Michael Martin Murphey, and Ray Wylie Hubbard. They were the musicians on such quintessential albums as Murphey's Geronimo's Cadillac and Cosmic Cowboy Souvenir and Jerry Jeff's Viva Terlingua. The original members of the band were Bob Livingston, Gary P. Nunn, John Inmon, Kelly Dunn, Tomas Ramirez and Donny Dolan. Over the years, the band has also included Paul Pearcy, Craig D. Hillis, Herbert Steiner, Mike Holleman, Michael McGeary, Bobby Smith, Lloyd Maines, Radoslav Lorković and Riley Osbourn.

The Lost Gonzo Band released three albums in the 1970s: Lost Gonzo Band (1975) and Thrills (1976) on MCA Records, and Signs of Life (1977) on Capitol Records. The band appeared on the PBS program Austin City Limits in 1976, 1978 and 1986. In the 1990s, the band recorded two CDs for Vireo Records: Rendezvous in 1992 and Hands of Time in 1995. Demon Records, a company based in England, released a compilation CD of the first two MCA records entitled, Dead Armadillos in 1998. Reviewing The Lost Gonzo Band in 1975, Village Voice critic Robert Christgau wrote:

All of the members of the original band still have active music careers and occasionally reunite for concerts. Under the direction of manager, D Foster, The Lost Gonzo Band returned to the stage for the first time in nine years for a sold out show at Gruene Hall Oct 22, 2021. The lineup included original members Gary P Nunn on guitar, Bob Livingston on bass, John Inmon on lead guitar and Steady Freddie Krc on drums.  Texas musicians Steve Layne on guitar and David Webb on keyboards rounded out the group. More shows are being planned to coincide with the approaching 50th anniversaries of both the Lost Gonzo Band, Murphey's Geronimo's Cadillac and Jerry Jeff Walker's Viva Terlingua in 2023.

Discography
The Lost Gonzo Band (MCA Records); 1975
Thrills (MCA Records); 1976
Signs of Life (Capitol Records); 1977
Rendezvous (Vireo); 1992
Hands of Time (Vireo); 1995.
Dead Armadillos (Demon Records); 1998

References

External links
The Lost Gonzo Band
Bob Livingston
John Inmon
Gary P. Nunn

1972 establishments in Texas
1998 disestablishments in Texas
American country rock groups
Musical groups from Texas
Musical groups established in 1972
Musical groups disestablished in 1998